Peter Robert Marler ForMemRS (February 24, 1928 – July 5, 2014) was a British-born American ethologist and zoosemiotician known for his research on animal sign communication and the science of  bird song. A 1964 Guggenheim Fellow, he was emeritus professor of neurobiology, physiology and ethology at  the University of California, Davis.

Education
Born in Slough, England, Marler graduated from University College London with a BSc in 1948, and a Ph.D. in botany in 1952. 
In 1954, he graduated from the University of Cambridge with a second Ph.D. in zoology.

Career
From 1954 to 1956, he worked as a research assistant to William Homan Thorpe and Robert Hinde at Jesus College, Cambridge. In 1957, he became a professor at the University of California, Berkeley. In 1966, he became a professor at Rockefeller University, in 1969 became director of the Institute for Research in Animal Behavior, a collaboration between the New York Zoological Society (now the Wildlife Conservation Society) and Rockefeller University and in 1972 became director of the Field Research Center for Ethology and Ecology.

In 1989, Marler became a professor at the University of California, Davis. He retired in 1994, but took over the management of the local Center for Animal Behavior from 1996 to 2000. He died on July 5, 2014, of pneumonia while his family was evacuated from his Winters home because of the nearby Monticello wildfire.

Research
Marler was an internationally recognized researcher in the field of bird song. Through his work with songbirds, he helped gain fundamental insights into the acquisition of song. He also studied the development of communication skills in several primate species: chimpanzees and gorillas, along with Jane Goodall and Hugo van Lawick, and the southern green monkey, in collaboration with Tom Struhsaker, Dorothy Cheney and Robert Seyfarth. Peter Marler developed the first properly semiotic approach to animal communication. His work greatly informed our understanding of memory, learning, and the importance of auditory and social experience. His work group included many well-known ornithologist and behavioral scientists, including Masakazu Konishi, Fernando Nottebohm, Susan Peters, Don Kroodsma, Bill Searcy, Steve Nowicki, Ken Yasukawa, and John Wingfield.

Awards and honours
Marler was elected to the American Academy of Arts and Sciences in 1970, the United States National Academy of Sciences in 1971, and the American Philosophical Society in 1983. Marler was elected a Foreign Member of the Royal Society (ForMemRS) in 2008. His nomination reads:

Selected publications
Palleroni, A., M. Hauser & P. Marler (2005). "Do responses of galliform birds vary adaptively with predator size?" Animal Cognition. (8): 200–210.
Partan, S.R.; P. Marler (2005) "Issues in the classification of multimodal communication signals". American Naturalist. (166): 231–245.
Palleroni, A., C.T. Miller, M. Hauser, & P. Marler (2005). "Prey plumage adaptation against falcon attack". Nature. (434): 973–974.
Nelson, D.A. & P. Marler (2005). "Do bird nestmates learn the same songs?" Animal Behaviour. (69): 1007–1010.
Marler, P. (2005). "Ethology and the origins of behavioral endocrinology". Hormones and Behavior. (47): 493–502.
Marler, P. (2004). "Science and birdsong: The good old days". In: Nature's Music: The Science of Birdsong, P. Marler & H. Slabbekoorn (eds.). Elsevier Academic Press, San Diego, CA, pp. 1–38.
Marler, P. (2000). "Origins of music and speech: insights from animals". In: The Origins of Music, N. Wallin, B. Merker, and S. Brown (eds.). Cambridge: The MIT Press, 31–48.
Marler P. (1999). "How much does a human environment humanize a chimp". American Anthropologist. (101): 432–436.
Marler P. and DF Sherry (1999). "The nature and nurture of developmental plasticity". Proceedings of the 22nd International Ornithological Congress. Durban South Africa: University of Natal Press.
Marler, P. (1978). Affective and symbolic meaning: Some zoosemiotic speculations. In Thomas A. Sebeok (ed.): Sight, Sound and Sense. Bloomington: Indiana University Press, 113–123.

References

External links
Neurotree entry

1928 births
Ethologists
Semioticians
Foreign Members of the Royal Society
University of California, Davis faculty
Alumni of University College London
Alumni of the University of Cambridge
2014 deaths
People from Slough
People educated at Upton Court Grammar School
Wildlife Conservation Society people
British ornithologists
Members of the American Philosophical Society